2004 presidential election may refer to:
 2004 Afghan presidential election
 2004 Algerian presidential election
 2004 Austrian presidential election
 2004 Dominican Republic presidential election
 2004 Georgia presidential election
 2004 Icelandic presidential election
 2004 Irish presidential election
 2004 Macedonian presidential election
 2004 Panamanian election
 2004 Philippine general election
 2004 Taiwan (Republic of China) presidential election
 2004 Russian presidential election
 2004 Salvadoran presidential election
 2004 Serbian presidential elections
 2004 Ukrainian presidential election
 2004 United States presidential election